The Connecticut warbler (Oporornis agilis) is a small songbird of the New World warbler family.

Description
These medium-sized warblers measure  in length, with a  wingspan. This species has light yellow underparts and olive upper-parts; they have a light eye ring, pink legs, a long tail, pale wing bars and a thin pointed bill. Males have a grey hood; female and immatures are more brown and have a whitish throat.

They forage on the ground, picking among dead leaves, or hop along branches. Like most warblers, these birds mainly eat insects and similar small invertebrates. Specifically, they eat spiders, snails and caterpillars. They will also supplement their diet occasionally with seeds and berries. They are "skulking" birds that usually spend their time foraging within dense, low vegetation. Such behavior often renders them difficult to see well.

Despite its name, this bird only rarely visits Connecticut during migration. It was named by Alexander Wilson who observed the first classified specimen. They are fairly elusive birds, but it appears that their numbers may be declining due to loss of winter habitat.

Taxonomy
Most classification systems consider the genus to be monophyletic. It used to be considered paraphyletic, and it was paired with the Mourning, Kentucky and MacGillivray's warblers in the genus Oporornis. However, recent studies have found that these three warblers were more closely related to the yellowthroats which belong to the genus Geothlypis.

Habitat 
Their breeding habitat is bogs or open deciduous woods near water, especially with poplar, spruce, tamarack or aspen, in central Canada and states bordering the Great Lakes.  These habitats tend to be in rather remote areas that are hard to access for fieldwork; therefore, there is little data available on this species of birds. The nest is an open cup well-concealed in moss or a clump of grass. It is made of "dry grasses, stalk of weeds and horsehairs".

Breeding 
Courtship begins right after the migrants arrive on their breeding grounds. It correlates with the time when males start to sing as this is how they court females. Couples have one brood per season. Connecticut warblers like to nest in thick understory where their young are protected from predators. Most lay in mid-June, though some populations have been observed to lay in July. Their eggs have a creamy color and they are speckled and blotched with chestnut and bay. Only females incubate. Fledglings are observed in late July and at the latest at the end of August. Both parents feed their young caterpillars, larvae, moth and berries.

Vocalization 
The song of this bird is a loud repeated . It's "similar in pitch to the Kentucky warbler and the Ovenbird". The call is a nasal pitch, it sounds like a raspy "witch". Like many songbirds, its song is heard during breeding season but rarely during the fall.

Behavior 
The Connecticut warbler walks on the ground to forage insects and other sources of food. Its tail bobs up and down, which is reminiscent of wren and sandpiper behaviour. When it comes to sociability, the Connecticut warbler is a solitary species; however, groups of about twenty-five will come together in the fall before migration. It also will join other species, such as Blackpoll warblers, to feed during the fall.  Males are highly territorial during breeding season, they defend an area which ranges from 0.24–0.48 hectares. When it comes to parental care, both the male and the female will feed the juvenile. They will defend their young by screeching at predators.

Migration 
As mentioned earlier, the Connecticut warbler is an elusive species. Little is known about it outside of the breeding season as to this date, less than 25,000 individuals have been banded. These birds migrate to the Amazon Basin in South America in winter. Specimens have been observed in Colombia (north & southeast), Venezuela (northeast & interior), Guyana (at the border), and Peru (South). Connecticut warblers undertake different migratory routes in spring and in fall, an atypical behavior. In spring, they normally pass through the Midwest and only rarely migrate to the East coast, but in fall, larger numbers of migrating birds move through the East coast. Recently, the use of small tracking devices have enabled scientists to gather more data on the warbler's migration routes.  They have discovered some individuals fly over open water like the Blackpoll warbler. More specifically, they recorded a previously undocumented two day flight over the Caribbean to the Antillean islands. This correlates with sightings of Connecticut warblers that have occurred in Bermuda, St Thomas and St Martin.The island of Hispaniola is also a popular stop as it is rather remote due to past humanitarian crises. There, they make a minimum of 48 hour stop (it usually lasts 5–7 days) in the Caribbean. This long migration over open water calls for strong selective pressures. A comparative study between the Connecticut warbler and the Blackpoll warbler could help determine what selective pressures are present in these two species. This kind of migration also demands large reserves of fuel and this is why fat Connecticut warblers can be found on the East coast in early fall. It's also the reason why they make several stopovers on their way South.

Current threats 
One of the main causes of mortality during migration is the collision of individuals into man-made structures. Collisions often occur against transparent glass panes, through which individuals can see vegetation and light. Habitat destruction is another threat to Connecticut warbler populations. Aspen logging on their breeding range (i.e. BC) and the application of pesticides gets rids of nesting locations. The infestation of budworm on jack-pine trees also puts nesting sites at risk. The presence of power lines is also a danger to the Connecticut warbler: studies show that the presence of power lines reduces population densities in areas where they are present. In Alberta breeding sites, noise disturbances from gas pipelines are detrimental to the species as well. Studies show that Connecticut warblers did well in forests that have been cleared off of shrubs and understory as they prefer trees; however, their abundance decreased in areas where the forest was clear-cut. Connecticut warblers are on the IUCN red list as a species of Least Concern. Nevertheless, some of its populations in Saskatchewan, Michigan, Minnesota and Wisconsin are at risk. Conservation efforts are difficult due to a lack of research, though a handful of researchers have written some management plans, focusing on the preservation of woody wetlands, which are the Connecticut warbler's favored habitat.

References

Further reading

Books
 Pitocchelli, J., J. Bouchie, and D. Jones. 1997. Connecticut Warbler (Oporornis agilis). In The Birds of North America, No. 320 (A. Poole and F. Gill, eds.). The Academy of Natural Sciences, Philadelphia, PA, and The American Ornithologists' Union, Washington, D.C.

Report
 Cooper JM, Enns KA & Shepard MG. (1997). Status of the Connecticut warbler in British Columbia. Canadian Research Index. p. n/a.

Articles
 
 
 Elder DH. (1991). Breeding Habitat of the Connecticut Warbler in the Rainy River District. Ontario Birds. vol 9, no 3. pp. 84–86.
 Ferguson RS. (1981). Summer Birds of the Northwest Angle Provincial Forest and Adjacent Southeastern Manitoba Canada. Syllogeus. vol 31, pp. 1–23.
 Hall D. (1995). On rarity and mischance. The Yale Review. vol 83, no 2. p. 74.
 
 Jahn O, Viteri MEJ & Schuchmann K-L. (1999). Connecticut Warbler, a North American migrant new to Ecuador. Wilson Bulletin. vol 111, no 2. pp. 281–282.
 Machtans CS. (2000). Extra-limital observations of Broad-winged Hawk, Buteo platypterus, Connecticut Warbler, Oporornis agilis, and other bird observations from the Liard Valley, Northwest Territories. Canadian Field-Naturalist. vol 114, no 4. pp. 671–679.
 McCaskie G. (1970). Occurrence of the Eastern Species of Oporornis and Wilsonia in California. Condor. vol 72, no 3. pp. 373–374.
 McKenzie PM & Noble RE. (1989). Sight Records for Connecticut Warbler Oporornis-Agilis and Yellow-Throated Vireo Vireo-Flavifrons in Puerto Rico USA. Florida Field Naturalist. vol 17, no 3. pp. 69–72.
 McNair DB, Massiah EB & Frost MD. (1999). New and rare species of Nearctic landbird migrants during autumn for Barbados and the Lesser Antilles. Caribbean Journal of Science. vol 35, no 1–2. pp. 46–53.
 Morgan JG & Eubanks TLJ. (1979). Connecticut Warbler Oporornis-Agilis New-Record in Texas USA. Bulletin of the Texas Ornithological Society. vol 12, no 1. pp. 21–22.
 
 
 Parmelee DF & Oehlenschlager RJ. (1972). Connecticut Warbler Nest in Hubbard County Minnesota. Loon. vol 44, no 1. pp. 5–6.
 Rogers TH. (1982). The Spring Migration March 1 – May 31, 1982 Northern Rocky Mountain Intermountain Region Canada USA. American Birds. vol 36, no 5. pp. 875–877.
 
 Shanahan D. (1992). Notes on calls of breeding Connecticut warblers. Ontario Birds. vol 10, no 3. pp. 115–116.
 Shier GR. (1971). 1st Fall Record of the Connecticut Warbler in Colorado. Colorado Field Ornithologist. vol 10, pp. 19–20.

External links
 Connecticut Warbler Species Account – Cornell Lab of Ornithology
 Connecticut Warbler – Oporornis agilis – USGS Patuxent Bird Identification InfoCenter

Connecticut warbler
Birds of Canada
Native birds of the Canadian Prairies
Native birds of the Northeastern United States
Birds of South America
Connecticut warbler
Taxa named by Alexander Wilson (ornithologist)